Margaret is a feminine given name, derived via French and Latin from  meaning "pearl". The Greek is borrowed from Persian.

Margaret has been an English name since the 11th century, and remained popular throughout the Middle Ages. It became less popular between the 16th century and 18th century, but became more common again after this period, becoming the second-most popular female name in the United States in 1903. Since this time, it has become less common, but was still the ninth-most common name for women of all ages in the United States as of the 1990 census.

Margaret has many diminutive forms in many different languages, including Maggie, Madge, Daisy, Margarete, Marge, Margo, Margie, Marjorie, Meg, Megan, Rita, Greta, Gretchen, and Peggy.

Name variants

Full name
  (Scottish)
  (Scottish)
  (Irish)
  (Irish)
  (Dutch), (German), (Swedish)
  (English)

Diminutives
  (English)
  (English)
  (Scottish)

First half
  (French)
  (Welsh)

Second half
  (English), (German), (Italian), (Lithuanian), (Polish), (Swedish),
 (English), (German),
  (English), (Estonian), (Hungarian), (Estonian)

Nobility

Austria 

 Margaret, Countess of Tyrol (1318–1369)

Belgium and the Netherlands 

 Margaret of Austria, Duchess of Savoy (1480–1530), Princess of Asturias and Duchess of Savoy by her two marriages
 Margaret of Parma (1522–1586), illegitimate daughter of Charles V and Johanna Maria van der Gheynst
 Margaret of York (1446–1503), Duchess of Burgundy and wife of Charles the Bold, Regent of France

Denmark 

 Margaret I of Denmark (1353–1412)
 Margrethe II of Denmark (born 1940)

England and Scotland 

 Lady Margaret Fortescue (1923–2013), one of the UK's largest private landowners
 Margaret Beaufort, Countess of Richmond and Derby, (1443–1509), mother of Henry VII of England and paternal grandmother of King Henry VIII of England
 Margaret Douglas (1515–1578), daughter of Margaret Tudor
 Margaret of Anjou (1430–1482), wife of King Henry VI of England
 Margaret Pole, born Princess Margaret of York and Clarence (1473–1541), Countess of Salisbury
 Margaret Tudor (1489–1541), elder sister of Henry VIII of England and great-grandmother of James I of England
 Princess Margaret of Connaught (1882–1920), elder daughter of Prince Arthur, Duke of Connaught
 Princess Margaret, Countess of Snowdon (1930–2002), only sibling of Queen Elizabeth II and the younger daughter of King George VI and Queen Elizabeth
 Saint Margaret of Scotland,, Queen of Scots

France 

 Margaret of France, Duchess of Brabant (1254–1271)
 Margaret of Provence (1221–1285)
 Margaret of Valois (1553–1615)
 Marguerite de Navarre (1492–1549)

Hungary 

 Margaret of Hungary (1175–1223), wife of Isaac II Angelos Byzantine Emperor

Norway 

 Margaret of Scotland (Maid of Norway) (1282–1290)

Romania 

 Margareta of Romania (born 1949)

Religion 

 Margaret Brennan (1831–1887), Canadian nun
 Margaret B. Denning (1856-1935), American missionary and temperance worker
 Margaret Sampson (1906–1988), English nun

Canonised 

 Margaret Clitherow (1556–1586)
 Margaret the Barefooted (1325–1395)
 Saint Margaret Mary Alacoque (1647–1690)
 Saint Margaret of Castello (1287–1320)
 Saint Margaret of Cortona (1247–1297)
 Saint Margaret of England (died 1192)
 Saint Margaret of Hungary (1242–1270)
 Saint Margaret of Scotland (1045–1093)
 Saint Margaret the Virgin – the oldest and most prominent St. Margaret; also known as Margaret of Antioch

Beatified 

 Margaret Pole (1473–1541)
 Margaret Ward (1550–1588)

Artists and authors 

 Maggie Smith (born 1934), British actress
 Maisie Williams (born 1997), English actress.
 Margaret Uyauperq Aniksak (1907–1993), Inuit sculptor
 Margaret Ashmore Sudduth (1859–1957), American educator, editor, temperance advocate
 Margaret Atwood (born 1939), Canadian novelist and poet
 Margaret Avison (1918–2007), Canadian poet
 Margaret Barnard (1898–1992), British painter and linocut maker
 Margaret Barr (choreographer) (1904–1991), Australian dance-drama choreographer
 Margaret Berger (born 1985), Norwegian singer-songwriter
 Margaret Bourke-White (1904–1971), American photojournalist
 Margaret Busby, Ghanaian British publisher and writer
 Margaret Cavendish, Duchess of Newcastle-upon-Tyne (1623–1673), English writer, poet, and playwright.
 Margaret Cho (born 1968), American comedian and actress
 Margaret Clark (born 1943), Australian author
 Margaret Clarkson, English artist
 Margaret Cleaves (1848–1917), American physician, writer
 Margaret Wootten Collier (1869-1947), American author
 Margaret Deland (1857–1945), American author
 Margaret Drabble, English author
 Margaret E. Winslow (1836–1936), American activist, editor, author
 Margaret Eleanor Parker (1827–1896), American social activist, social reformer, travel writer
 Margaret Elizabeth Sangster (1838–1912), American author, poet, editor
 Margaret Forster, British author
 Margaret Frame (1903–1985), Canadian painter
 Margaret Frances Sullivan (1847–1903), Irish-American writer, journalist, editor
 Margaret Fuller (1810–1850), American critic
 Margaret Gale (born 1930), British operatic soprano
 Margaret Harker (1920–2013), British photographer and historian of photography
 Margaret Hillis, American conductor
 Margaret Hunt Brisbane (1858–1925), American poet
 Margaret Lane (1907–1994), British journalist, biographer and novelist
 Margaret Larkin (1899–1967), American writer
 Margaret Laurence (1926–1987), Canadian novelist
 Margaret Leighton (1922–1976), English actress
 Margaret Lockwood (1916–1990), British actress
 Margaret Manton Merrill, British-American journalist, writer, translator, elocutionist
 Margaret Mazzantini (born 1961), Italian-Irish author
 Margaret McDonald Bottome (1827-1906), American reformer, organizational founder, author
 Margaret Mitchell (1900–1949), American author
 Margaret Ogden (born 1952), American fantasy author best known by the pen name Robin Hobb
 Margaret Oliphant (1828–1897), Scottish author
 Margaret Bloodgood Peeke (1838-1908), American traveler, lecturer, author 
 Margaret Peterson Haddix (born 1964), American writer
 Margaret Randall (born 1936), US writer
 Margaret Roper (1505–1544), English writer, translator
 Margaret Rutherford (1892–1972), British actress of the stage and screen
 Margaret Scobie (born 1948), Australian indigenous Aboriginal painter
 Margaret (singer) (born 1991), Polish singer and songwriter
 Margaret Tracey (born 1967), American ballet dancer
 Margaret Travolta, American actress
 Margaret Walker (1915–1998), American author
 Margaret Whiting (1924–2011), American popular music and country music singer
 Margaret Wise Brown (1910–1952), American author
 Margaret Wynne Lawless (1847–1926), American poet, author, educator, philanthropist
 Margaret Keane (1927–2022), American painter
 Meg Stuart (born 1965), American choreographer, dancer, performing artist

Educators and scientists 

 Margaret Haley (1861–1939), American educator, promoted teacher's unions
 Margaret Becklake (1922–2018), Canadian academic and epidemiologist
 Margaret Burbidge (1919–2020), British astronomer
 Margaret Byers (1832–1912), Irish educator, activist, social reformer, missionary, writer
 Margaret Mordecai Jones Cruikshank (1878–1955), American educator and college president
 Margaret Elisabeth Felix (born 1937), Indian educator
 Margaret Floy Washburn (1871–1939), American psychologist
 Margaret Frame, Scottish scientist, professor of molecular cell biology
 Margaret Gurney (1908–2002), American mathematician, statistician, and computer programmer
 Margaret Hamilton, American computer scientist
 Margaret Howe Lovatt, naturalist
 Margaret Hutchinson, English educator, naturalist and author
 Margaret Lin Xavier (1898–1932), Thai physician
 Margaret Mead, American anthropologist
 Margaret Helen Read (1889–1991), British social anthropologist and academic
 Margaret Warner Morley (1858–1923), American biologist, wrote children's books on biology
 Margaret Wiecek, Polish-American operations researcher

Politics 

 Margaret A. Davidson (1950–2017), American lawyer and coastal science pioneer
 Margaret (Ann) Coffey (born 1946), former British Member of Parliament for Stockport
 Margaret Beckett (born 1943), British Member of Parliament for Derby South
 Margaret Curran (born 1958), former British Member of Parliament for Glasgow East
 Margaret Davidson (1871–1964), British wife of colonial governor of New South Wales, Australia
 Margaret Davidson (suffragist) (1879–1978), Scottish suffragist, teacher and WW1 nurse
 Margaret Ewing (1945–2006), Scottish politician
 Margaret Ferrier (born 1960), British Member of Parliament for Rutherglen and Hamilton West
 Margaret Greenwood (born 1959), British Member of Parliament for Wirral West
 Margarett (Maggie) Hassan (born 1958), United States Senator for New Hampshire
 Margaret Hodge (born 1944), British Member of Parliament for Barking
 Margaret Hoover (born 1977), American political consultant and commentator, great-granddaughter of the former president
 Margaret Gardner Hoey (1875–1942), American political hostess and First Lady of North Carolina
 Margaret (Maggie) Jones, Baroness Jones of Whitchurch, British Labour Peer and trade union official
 Margaret Mitchell (Canadian politician) (1925–2017), New Democratic Party Member of Parliament for Vancouver East
 Margaret Mitchell (Scottish politician) (born 1952), Scottish Conservative politician
 Margaret Moran (born 1955), former Labour MP for Luton South who was convicted of the largest amount of fraud in the United Kingdom parliamentary expenses scandal
 Margaret Ritchie (born 1958), politician who served in the Northern Ireland Assembly and both British Houses of Parliament
 Margaret Rose Sanford (1918–2006), First Lady of North Carolina
 Margaret Selina Martei, Ghanaian Member of Parliament for Asamankese (1965–1966)
 Margaret Thatcher (1925–2013), first female Prime Minister of the United Kingdom who served from 1979 to 1990
 Margeret (Maggie) Throup (born 1967), British Member of Parliament for Erewash

Sports 
 Margaret Boyd (1913–1993), English lacrosse player and schoolteacher
 Margaret Court (born 1942), Australian tennis player
 Margaret Groos (born 1959), American long-distance runner
 Margaret Hoelzer (born 1983), American swimmer
 Margaret Jeffery (1920–2004), British swimmer and Olympian
 Margaret Martin (born 1979), American professional bodybuilder
 Margaret Maughan (1928–2020), British Paralympic archer
 Margaret McIver (1933–2020), Australian equestrian

Other 
 Margaret Barclay (accused witch),  1618 as a result of witch trials held in Irvine, Ayrshire
 Margaret Catherine Blaikie (1823-1915), Scottish temperance reformer
 Margaret Brent, English immigrant colonial landowner
 Margaret Casely-Hayford (born 1959), British lawyer
 Margaret Cochran Corbin (1751–1800), fought in the U.S. Revolutionary War and was given a pension by Congress
 Margaret Douie Dougal (1858-1938), British chemical publication indexer 
 Margaret Dye Ellis (1845-1925), American social reformer
 Margaret E. Kuhn (1905–1995), founder of the Gray Panthers organisation
 Margaret Elizabeth Douglas (1934–2008), English television producer and executive
 Margaret Feeny (1917–2012), founder and first director of London's Africa Centre
 Margaret Hampshire (1918–2004), British educator and civil servant
 Margaret Haughery (1813–1882), philanthropist known as "the mother of the orphans"
 Margaret Jeffrey (1896–1977), Australian police officer
 Margaret Bischell McFadden, American philanthropist and social worker
 Margaret Olivia Slocum Sage (1828–1918), American philanthropist who established the Russell Sage Foundation
 Margaret Prior (1773–1842), American humanitarian, missionary, moral reform worker, writer
 Margaret Sanger (1879–1966), founder of the birth control movement in the United States
 Margaret Swain (1909–2002), English embroidery and textile historian

Fictional characters 

 Margaret Evelyn "Maggie" Simpson, in the TV show The Simpsons
 Margaret Fish, a chiropodist and a character in Bob and Margaret
 Margaret Hale, heroine in Elizabeth Gaskell's 1855 novel North and South
 Margaret Hooper, secretary to White House Chiefs of Staff Leo McGarry and CJ Cregg played by NiCole Robinson in the TV series The West Wing
 Margaret Houlihan, character in both the movie and television show M*A*S*H
 Margaret in Much Ado About Nothing, by Shakespeare
 Margaret "Meg" March, character in Little Women by Louisa May Alcott
 Margaret Mildred "Kit" Kittredge, in the Kit Kittredge series of American Girl books and related toys
 Margaret Moonlight, a boss in the Suda 51 game No More Heroes 2: Desperate Struggle
 Margaret "Peggy" Bundy, a character played by Katey Sagal in the 1987–97 Fox sitcom Married... with Children
 Margaret "Peggy" Carter, a character featured in several storylines published by Marvel Comics
 Margaret White, in the 1974 novel Carrie by Stephen King
 Margaret, a character in the Cartoon Network animated series Regular Show
 Mistress Margaret Page in The Merry Wives of Windsor, by Shakespeare
 Margaret SquarePants, SpongeBob's mother and Harold's wife in SpongeBob SquarePants
 Margaret "Maggie" Horton, a character on the soap opera Days of Our Lives

See also 

 Margaret (disambiguation)

References

External links 

 

English feminine given names
Given names derived from gemstones
Given names of Greek language origin
Given names